Tharinda Wijesinghe (born 18 December 1997) is a Sri Lankan cricketer. He made his Twenty20 debut for Kurunegala Youth Cricket Club in the 2017–18 SLC Twenty20 Tournament on 1 March 2018. He made his List A debut for Kurunegala Youth Cricket Club in the 2017–18 Premier Limited Overs Tournament on 11 March 2018.

References

External links
 

1997 births
Living people
Sri Lankan cricketers
Kurunegala Youth Cricket Club cricketers
Place of birth missing (living people)